The Betfair European Tour 2012/2013 – Event 6 (also known as the 2013 FFB Open and the 2013 Arcaden Munich Open) was a professional minor-ranking snooker tournament that took place over 26–27 November 2012 at the World Snooker Academy in Sheffield, England with the first three rounds and 4–6 January 2013 at the Event Forum in Fürstenfeldbruck, Germany from the last 32 onwards.

Stephen Maguire was the defending champion, but he lost 2–4 in the last 32 against Anthony Hamilton.

Mark Selby won his 10th professional title by defeating Graeme Dott 4–3 in the final.

Prize fund and ranking points
The breakdown of prize money and ranking points of the event is shown below:

1 Only professional players can earn ranking points.

Main draw

Preliminary round 

Best of 7 frames

Main rounds

Top half

Section 1

Section 2

Section 3

Section 4

Bottom half

Section 5

Section 6

Section 7

Section 8

Finals

Century breaks

 141, 101  Anthony Hamilton
 141  Jamie Cope
 141  Thepchaiya Un-Nooh
 140  Thanawat Thirapongpaiboon
 139  Dominic Dale
 137, 124, 106  Mark Selby
 134  Ryan Day
 129  Neil Robertson
 128, 118, 105  Ben Woollaston
 123, 117  Jack Lisowski
 122  Mark King
 120  Martin Gould
 117  Matthew Stevens
 117  Aditya Mehta
 116  Alan McManus
 115, 106, 102  Graeme Dott
 113, 101  Rod Lawler
 113  Ian Burns
 113  Jimmy White
 117  Fergal O'Brien

 110, 109  Tian Pengfei
 110  Joel Walker
 109  Allan Taylor
 109  Liu Chuang
 108  Liang Wenbo
 108  Mark Joyce
 108  Stephen Maguire
 107  Stuart Bingham
 106, 105, 103  Marco Fu
 106, 105  Xiao Guodong
 106  Mark Davis
 105  Joe Swail
 103  Paul Davison
 102, 100  Luca Brecel
 101  Joe Perry
 100  Jamie Burnett
 100  Ricky Walden
 100  Kyren Wilson
 101  Liam Monk

References

FFB Open
E6
2012 in English sport
2013 in German sport